Dino Shafeek (born Gholam D. Shafeek, 21 March 1930 – 10 March 1984) was a Bangladeshi-British comedy actor. Born and raised in Dhaka, he moved to the United Kingdom from East Pakistan (now Bangladesh) in 1958 and appeared in several sitcoms during the 1970s and early 1980s. He is best remembered for playing the part of Chai Wallah Muhammed in the BBC sitcom It Ain't Half Hot Mum and the role of Ali Nadim in ITV sitcom Mind Your Language.

Career
Shafeek was involved with amateur theatre in Dacca and, after emigrating to England in 1958, enrolled at the Guildhall School of Music and Drama. His first film role was as 'Akbar' in the film The Long Duel (1967), starring Yul Brynner.

It Ain't Half Hot Mum
It Ain't Half Hot Mum is a BBC comedy series written by Jimmy Perry and David Croft, the writers of Dad's Army. Set in World War II British India, it follows the fortunes and activities of a concert party troop attached to the Royal Artillery. The series was broadcast by the BBC from 1974 to 1981 and starred Windsor Davies as the staff sergeant-major of the troop's barracks in Deolali, Bombay Presidency.

Shafeek plays "Chaiwallah Muhammad", selling tea from his ever-ready urn with his catchphrase "chai garam chai (Eng. 'tea, hot tea')." He also sings the musical interludes between the scenes, which are mostly World War II-era hits accompanied by a sitar. At the end of the final credits, he starts to sing "Land of Hope and Glory" only to be interrupted by the Sergeant-major shouting his ubiquitous ear-shattering "SHUTUPPP!!!." Muhammad was later promoted to bearer when the actor who played Rangi Ram (Michael Bates) died after Series 5 was recorded.

Mind Your Language
During the run of It Ain't Half Hot Mum, Shafeek played the part of student Ali Nadim in the ITV/London Weekend Television sitcom Mind Your Language (1977–1979). Along with Barry Evans as their teacher, Ali was one of a group of people from diverse backgrounds in an English as a Foreign Language class at a London night-school. Ali was a Muslim Pakistani who had emigrated to the United Kingdom, and was frequently seen bickering with Ranjeet Singh (Albert Moses), a Sikh from India. Ali told Ranjeet he will "kick [him] up the Khyber" ("Khyber Pass" being rhyming slang for "arse"). As the series progresses, their relationship mellows into one of friendly and mutual supportiveness.

Other roles
Shafeek played character parts in films and TV such as Carry On Emmannuelle, Minder, Special Branch and The Onedin Line.

His last role was in High Road to China starring Tom Selleck.

Death
Shafeek died suddenly from a heart attack whilst at home in London with his fiancée Leslie Didcock on 10 March 1984, eleven days before his 54th birthday.

Filmography

Film

Television

Theatre

Discography

Albums

See also
 British Bangladeshi
 List of British Bangladeshis

References

External links
 

1930 births
1984 deaths
Bangladeshi Biharis
British Muslims
Bangladeshi emigrants to England
British people of Bangladeshi descent
Naturalised citizens of the United Kingdom
Bangladeshi male television actors
Bangladeshi male film actors
Bangladeshi male stage actors
British male television actors
British male film actors
British male stage actors
20th-century Bangladeshi male actors
20th-century British male actors
British male actors of South Asian descent
British male comedians
Muslim male comedians
People from Dhaka
University of Dhaka alumni
Alumni of the Guildhall School of Music and Drama
20th-century British comedians
Urdu-speaking Bangladeshi